Banke may refer to:
Banke District, a district in Nepal
Bankə, a municipality in Azerbaijan
Paul Banke (born 1964), American boxer

See also
 Banka (disambiguation)